Lethalz is a 2019 American short crime film  directed by Rumena Dinevska.

His the premiere demonstration took place   February 2, 2019 at the Indie Night Film Festival.

Plot
A women's gang of fighters for justice gets together to destroy a brutal crime syndicate. But lies, intrigues, as well as their dark past put them at risk of death.

Cast
 Sean Blakemore as David Claude
 Kofi Boakye as Rocky
 Samantha Grace as Lindsay Owen
 Keturah Hamilton as Samantha
 Raymond Karago as Bartender
 Lexy Lane as Young Nicole
Leon Ross as Bash
Caroline Sweet as Dr. Grand
Lena Tretyakova as Young Lindsay
DaNae West as Sarah the Kid
 Ikumi Yoshimatsu as Lucy Suzuki

Awards and nominations

Awards
Festigious International Film Festival 2019
  Inspiring Woman in a Film (Ally Teixeira)
NYC Indie Film Awards 2019
Gold Awards for Best Short Film

Nominations
Hollywood International Moving Pictures Film Festival 2019
 Best Drama Short
 Best Drama Short
 LA Film Festival 2019
 Best Drama
 Best Produced Screenplay

References

External links 
 

American short films
2019 short films
American crime films